Carlos Alberto Zegarra Zamora (born 2 March 1977, in Lima) is a retired Peruvian footballer. He gained 24 caps for Peru; his older brother Pablo also played for the national team.

Club career
Zegarra started his youth career in the famous Academia Cantolao

He had played in several Peruvian clubs including Alianza Lima and Sporting Cristal.

International career
Zegarra has made 24 appearances for the Peru national football team.

He returned to the Peru national team after a six-year absence on 23 May 2012 in a friendly match at home against Nigeria, at the age of 35. Sergio Markarian substituted him in the match for Antonio Gonzales in the 72nd minute to secure the 1–0 win for Peru.

References

External links
 
 

1977 births
Living people
Footballers from Lima
Association football midfielders
Peruvian footballers
Peru international footballers
Peruvian Primera División players
Sporting Cristal footballers
Alianza Atlético footballers
PAOK FC players
Club Alianza Lima footballers
Juan Aurich footballers
León de Huánuco footballers
Sport Huancayo footballers
FBC Melgar footballers
Super League Greece players
Peruvian expatriate footballers
Expatriate footballers in Greece